Amundsen Plain is an undersea abyssal plain named in association with Amundsen Coast. The name was approved by the Advisory Committee on Undersea Features in June 1988.

References
 

Abyssal plains of the Southern Ocean